Pseudonocardia sichuanensis is a bacterium from the genus of Pseudonocardia which has been isolated from the roots of the plant Jatropha curcas in Panzhihua in China.ref></ref>

References

External links
Type strain of Pseudonocardia sichuanensis at BacDive -  the Bacterial Diversity Metadatabase

Pseudonocardia
Bacteria described in 2012